US Sailing's Miami Olympic Classes Regatta is an annual sailing regatta at the US Sailing Center in Miami, the United States part of the ISAF Sailing World Cup. It hosts the Olympic and Paralympic classes.

Winners
Winners of the regatta in each class:

2.4 Metre

2002 –  Tom Brown
2003 –  Heiko Kroger
2004 –  Jeff Madrigali
2005 –  Stellan Berlin
2006 –  Stellan Berlin
2007 –  Stellan Berlin
2008 –  Damien Seguin
2009 –  Allan Leibel
2010 –  Paul Tingley
2011 –  Damien Seguin
2012 –  Damien Seguin
2013 –  Megan Pascoe
2014 –  Megan Pascoe
2015 –  Bjørnar Erikstad
2016 –  Helena Lucas

Men's 470

1993 –  Mike Sturman & Bob Little
1994 –  John Merricks & Ian Walker
1995 –  John Merricks & Ian Walker
1996 –  Matteo Ivaldi & Michele Ivaldi
1997 –  Morgan Reeser & Bob Merrick
1998 –  Larry Suter & Jonathan Farrar
1999 –  Graham Vials & Magnus Leask
2001 –  Kevin Teborek & Talbot Ingram
2002 –  Steven Hunt & Michael Miller
2003 –  Paul Foerster & Kevin Burnham
2004 –  Mikee Anderson-Mitterling & Graham Biehl
2005 –  Sven Coster & Kalle Coster
2006 –  Nic Asher & Elliot Willis
2007 –  Nick Rogers & Joe Glanfield
2009 –  Onan Barreiros & Aaron Sarmiento
2010 –  Anton Dahlberg & Sebastian Östling
2011 –  Nic Asher & Elliot Willis
2012 –  Mathew Belcher & Malcolm Page
2013 –  Stuart McNay & Dave Hughes
2014 –  Sofian Bouvet & Jeremie Mion
2015 –  Luke Patience & Elliot Willis
2016 –  Stuart McNay & Dave Hughes
2017 –  Stuart McNay & Dave Hughes
2018 –  Luke Patience & Chris Grube

Women's 470

1993 –  Allison Jolly & Lynne Shore
1994 –  Allison Jolly & Lynne Shore
1995 –  Anette Patrunky & Hanne Pilz
1996 –  Kris Stookey & Louise Van Voorhis
1997 –  Whitney Connor & Elizabet Kratzig
1998 –  Whitney Connor & Elizabet Kratzig
1999 –  Tracy Hayley & Louise Van Voorhis
2001 –  Courtenay Dey & Linda Wennerstrom
2002 –  Courtenay Dey & Linda Wennerstrom
2003 –  Katie McDowell & Isabelle Kinsolving
2004 –  Alina Grobe & Vivien Kussatz
2005 –  Amanda Clark & Sarah Mergenthaler
2006 –  Ingrid Petitjean & Nadege Douroux
2007 –  Marcelien de Koning & Lobke Berkhout
2009 –  Henriette Koch & Lene Sommer
2010 –  Amanda Clark & Sarah Chin
2011 –  Ingrid Petitjean & Nadège Douroux
2012 –  Lisa Westerhof & Lobke Berkhout
2013 –  Fernanda Oliveria & Ana Luiza Barbachan
2014 –  Sophie Weguelin & Eilidh McIntyre
2015 –  Jo Aleh & Polly Powrie
2016 –  Sasha Chen & Haiyan Gao
2017 –  Afrodite Zegers & Anneloes van Veen
2018 –  Tina Mrak & Veronika Macarol

49er

1998 –  Marcos Soares & Fabio Matune
2001 –  Andy Mack & Adam Lowry
2002 –  Andy Mack & Adam Lowry
2003 –  Tim Wadlow & Pete Spaulding
2004 –  Tim Wadlow & Pete Spaulding
2005 –  Morgan Larson & Pete Spaulding
2006 –  Piero Sibello & Gianfranco Sibello
2007 –  Morgan Larson & Pete Spaulding
2009 –  Nico Delle-Karth & Nikolaus Resch
2010 –  Manu Dyen & Stéphane Christidis
2011 –  John Pink & Richard Peacock
2012 –  Nico Delle-Karth & Nikolaus Resch
2013 –  Fred Strammer & Zach Brown
2014 –  Jonas Warrer & Peter Ørsted Lang
2015 –  Nico Delle-Karth & Nikolaus Resch
2016 –  Diego Botin le Chever & Iago Lopez Marra
2017 –  Dylan Fletcher-Scott & Stuart Bithell
2018 –  Dylan Fletcher-Scott & Stuart Bithell

49er FX

2013 –  Martine Soffiatti Grael & Kahena Kunze
2014 –  Sarah Steyaert & Julie Bossard
2015 –  Alexandra Maloney & Molly Meech
2016 –  Alexandra Maloney & Molly Meech
2017 –  Martine Soffiatti Grael & Kahena Kunza
2018 –  Victoria Jurczok & Anika Lorenz

Elliot 6m

2009 –  Lotte Meldgaard Pedersen, Tina Schmidt & Trine Palludan
2010 –  Anna Tunnicliffe, Molly Vandemoer & Debbie Capozzi
2011 –  Claire Leroy, Marie Riou & Élodie Bertrand
2012 –  Lucy MacGregor, Annie Lush & Kate Macgregor

Europe

1993 –  Tine Moberg-Parker
1994 –  Tine Moberg-Parker
1995 –  Marcia Pellicano
1996 –  Jenny Armstrong
1997 –  Laura Dunn
1998 –  Tine Moberg-Parker
2000 –  Soren Johnsen
2001 –  Meg Gaillard
2002 –  Meg Gaillard
2003 –  Lenka Smidova
2004 –  Lenka Smidova

Finn

1993 –  Richard Clarke
1994 –  Jose van der Ploeg
1995 –  Brian Ledbetter
1996 –  Phillipe Presti
1997 –  Sebastian Godefroid
1998 –  Larry Lemieux
1999 –  Rodrigo Miereles
2000 –  Richard Clarke
2001 –  Larry Lemieux
2002 –  Andrew Simpson
2003 –  J. Hoegh-Christensen
2004 –  M. Kusznierewicz
2005 –  Chris Cook
2006 –  Rafael Trujillo
2007 –  Peer Moberg
2009 –  Edward Wright
2010 –  Edward Wright
2011 –  Giles Scott
2012 –  Zach Railey
2013 –  Caleb Paine
2014 –  Giles Scott
2015 –  Giles Scott
2016 –  Jorge Zarif
2017 –  Jorge Zarif
2018 –  Giles Scott

Laser

1993 –  Jim Brady
1994 –  Peter Dreyfuss
1995 –  Roberto Scheidt
1996 –  Stefan Warkalla
1997 –  Antonio Goeters
1998 –  John Myrdal
1999 –  Mark Mendelblatt
2000 –  Karl Suneson
2001 –  Paul Goodison
2002 –  Paul Goodison
2003 –  Mark Mendelblatt
2004 –  Paul Goodison
2005 –  Brad Funk
2006 –  Paul Goodison
2007 –  Gustavo Lima
2008 –  Maciej Grabowski
2009 –  Nick Thompson
2010 –  Nick Thompson
2011 –  Rasmus Myrgren
2012 –  Paul Goodison
2013 –  Jesper Stålheim
2014 –  Tonči Stipanović
2015 –  Philipp Buhl
2016 –  Robert Scheidt
2017 –  Jean-Baptiste Bernaz
2018 –  Tom Burton

Laser Radial

2000 –  Anna Tunnicliffe
2005 –  Paige Railey
2006 –  Anna Tunnicliffe
2007 –  Sari Multala
2008 –  Paige Railey
2010 –  Paige Railey
2011 –  Paige Railey
2012 –  Lijia Xu
2013 –  Paige Railey
2014 –  Paige Railey
2015 –  Anne-Marie Rindom
2016 –  Evi Van Acker
2017 –  Vasileia Karachaliou
2018 –  Alison Young

Men's Mistral

1993 –  Dan Kerckhoff
1994 –  Nikos Kaklamanakis
1995 –  Jeanmax De Chavigny
1996 –  Jorje Marciel
1997 –  Mike Gebhardt
1998 –  Mike Gebhardt
1999 –  Mike Gebhardt
2000 –  Suzuki Kazuyoshi
2001 –  Peter Wells
2002 –  David Mier y Teren
2003 –  Nikos Kaklimanakis
2004 –  João Rodrigues

Women's Mistral

1993 –  Jayne Fenner
1994 –  Dorien de Vries
1995 –  Anne François
1996 –  Jayne Benedict
1997 –  Lanee Butler
1998 –  Helen Cartwright
1999 –  Lanee Butler
2000 –  Stephanie Guto
2001 –  Dominique Vallee
2002 –  Sigrid Rondelez
2003 –  Anja Kaeser
2004 –  Antonia Grey

Nacra 17

2013 –  Sarah Newberry & Matthew Whitehead
2014 –  Vittorio Bissaro & Silvia Sicouri
2015 –  Vittorio Bissaro & Silvia Sicouri
2016 –  Mandy Mulder & Coen de Koning
2017 –  Ben Saxton & Nicola Graves
2018 –  Jason Waterhouse & Lisa Darmanin

Men's RS:X

2006 –  Nick Dempsey
2007 –  Przeymslaw Miarczynski
2009 –  Dorian van Rijsselberge
2010 –  Dorian van Rijsselberge
2011 –  Dorian van Rijsselberge
2012 –  Nick Dempsey
2013 –  Iván Pastor
2014 –  Byron Kokkalanis
2015 –  Dorian van Rijsselberge
2016 –  Dorian van Rijsselberge
2017 –  Louis Giard
2018 –  Louis Giard

Women's RS:X

2006 –  Bryony Shaw
2007 –  Marina Alabau
2009 –  Marina Alabau
2010 –  Marina Alabau
2011 –  Marina Alabau
2012 –  Demita Vega De Lille
2013 –  Maayan Davidovich
2014 –  Bryony Shaw
2015 –  Bryony Shaw
2016 –  Bryony Shaw
2017 –  Yunxiu Lu
2018 –  Helene Noesmoen

SKUD 18

2007 –  Scott Whitman & Julia Dorsett
2008 –  Nick Scandone & Maureen McKinnon-Tucker
2009 –  Scott Whitman & Julia Dorsett
2010 –  Scott Whitman & Julia Dorsett
2011 –  Scott Whitman & Julia Dorsett
2012 –  Daniel Fitzgibbon & Liesl Tesch
2014 –  Alexandra Rickham & Niki Birrell
2015 –  Daniel Fitzgibbon & Liesl Tesch

Sonar

2002 –  Paul Callahan, Keith Burhans, Mike Hagmaier
2003 –  John Ross-Duggan, JP Creignou & Mike Ross
2004 –  Udo Hessels, Van de Veen Rossen
2005 –  John Robertson, Hannah Stodel & Steve Thomas Sunderland
2006 –  David Schroeder, Keith Burhans & Bill Mauk
2007 –  Dan Parsons, Tom Pygall & Guy Draper
2008 –  Jens Kroker, Tobias Schuetz & Siegmund Mainka
2009 –  John Robertson, Hannah Stodel & Alex Wang-Hansen
2010 –  Aleksander Wang-Hansen, Per Eugen Kristiansen & Marie Solberg
2011 –  John Robertson, Hannah Stodel & Steve Thomas
2012 –  Udo Hessels, Marcel van de Veen & Mischa Rossen
2013 –  Aleksander Wang-Hansen, Per Eugen Kristiansen & Marie Solberg
2014 –  Bruno Johnson, Eric Flageul & Nicolas Vimont-Vicary
2015 –  Aleksander Wang-Hansen, Per Eugen Kristiansen & Marie Solberg
2016 –  Paul Tingley, Logan Campbell & Scott Lucas

Star

1993 –  Mark Reynolds & Steve Erickson
1994 –  Jim Brady & Steve Erickson
1995 –  Peter Bromby & Lee White
1996 –  Mark Reynolds & Hal Haenel
1998 –  Eric Doyle & Brian Terhaar
1999 –  Mark Reynolds & Magnus Liljedahl
2000 –  Marc Pickel & Thomas Auracher
2001 –  John MacCausland & Peter Bromby
2002 –  Marc Pickel & David Giles
2003 –  Peter Bromby & Lee White
2004 –  Mark Reynolds & Steve Erickson
2005 –  Andrew Horton & Brad Nichol
2006 –  Xavier Rohart & Pascal Rambeau
2007 –  Fredrik Lööf & Anders Ekström
2008 –  Xavier Rohart & Pascal Rambeau
2009 –  Rick Merriman & Phil Trinter
2010 –  Eivind Melleby & Petter Morland Pederson
2011 –  Robert Scheidt & Bruno Prada
2012 –  Robert Scheidt & Bruno Prada

Tornado

1993 –  John C. Lovell & Charlie Ogletree
1994 –  David Williams & Ian Rhodes
1995 –  Andreas Hagara & Florian Schneebeger
1996 –  Andreas Hagara & Florian Schneebeger
1997 –  Robbie Daniel & Enrique Rodriguez
1998 –  David Sweeney & Kevin Smith
1999 –  Lars Guck & PJ Schaffer
2000 –  John C. Lovell & Charlie Ogletree
2001 –  Sean McCann & John Curtis
2002 –  Lars Guck & Jonathan Farrar
2003 –  Roman Hagara & Hans-Peter Steinacher
2004 –  Enrique Fugueroa & Jorge Hernández
2005 –  John C. Lovell & Charlie Ogletree
2006 –  John C. Lovell & Charlie Ogletree
2007 –  Darren Bundock & Glenn Ashby

Yngling

2002 –  Carol Cronin, Liz Filter & Kate Fears
2003 –  Sally Barkow, Debbie Capozzi & Carrie Howe
2004 –  Sharon Ferris, Kylie Jameson & Joanna White
2005 –  Sally Barkow, Debbie Capozzi & Carrie Howe
2006 –  Sally Barkow, Debbie Capozzi & Carrie Howe
2007 –  Sally Barkow, Debbie Capozzi & Carrie Howe
2008 –  Mandy Mulder, Mary Faber & Merel Witteveen

References

Annual sporting events in the United States
Sailing competitions in the United States
Sailing regattas
Sailing World Cup
Sailing in Florida
Sports in Miami